Trichophysetis metamelalis is a moth in the family Crambidae. It is found in India.

References

Cybalomiinae
Moths described in 1899
Moths of Asia